The second cabinet of Odilon Barrot was the government of France from 2 June 1849 to 31 October 1849 under President of the Council Odilon Barrot.
It followed the first cabinet of Odilon Barrot, dissolved before the elections to the Legislative Assembly, and was constituted by President Louis Napoleon.
It was dismissed on 31 October 1849 and replaced by the cabinet of Alphonse Henri d'Hautpoul.

Ministers
The ministers were:

References

Sources

French governments
1849 establishments in France
1849 disestablishments in France
Cabinets established in 1849
Cabinets disestablished in 1849